Lechia-Polonia Gdańsk is a now defunct team which played in the Polish second division from 1998–2001. The team was created by a merger of Lechia Gdańsk and Polonia Gdańsk.

History

Pre-merger

Polonia Gdańsk 

Polonia Gdańsk were founded in 1945 as NS Nit Gdańsk. After years of playing football in the lower divisions, and further name changes (Stal Gdańsk and RKS Stoczniowiec Gdańsk ). The team finally found stability and were called Polonia Gdańsk.

The team finally achieved promotion to the second division in 1973 after winning their division, and finishing as runners up the previous season. The 1970s saw the team's high point in their history. The team enjoyed 9 seasons in the second division before being relegated in 1982. The team's greatest achievement so far came in the 1976/77 season when the team finished 3rd, just missing out on promotion to the top division. From 1982-1998 Polonia experienced another 3 seasons in the second tier, each time only lasting in the division for one season. The team won the third tier 3 times during this period, as well as finishing runners up a further 5 times.

Lechia Gdańsk

Lechia Gdańsk were also founded in 1945. Lechia's greatest success in the top flight came during the 1950s, when the club finished 3rd during the 1956 season. After spending the 1960s and 70s in the lower divisions, Lechia won the Polish Cup and the Polish SuperCup in 1983. After a spell back in the top flight, Lechia soon found themselves playing in the lower divisions once more. During the 1995 season, Lechia had previously been part of another merger, this time with Olimpia Poznań to create Olimpia-Lechia Gdańsk. The merger lasted only one season before both teams split. It was only two seasons after their first merger that Lechia were to be involved in another, this time with Polonia.

Lechia-Polonia Gdańsk 

The first season for Lechia-Polonia was moderately successful. The previous season Polonia finished in 5th place, for the 1998–99 season Lechia-Polonia managed to achieve 7th in the league. The following season was more unsuccessful, finishing the season in 14th. Robert Kubiel finished as the team's highest goalscorer with 10 goals to his name. The following season got worse for Lechia-Polonia, with the team finishing 19th out of 20 teams. Despite being in a lower division the team proved to be less than competitive, and the team once again faced relegation, this time finishing in 15th. After the 2001–02 season, the Lechia-Polonia dissolved.

After the merger 

Polonia Gdańsk created a separate team in 1999, one year after the merger. Despite the team still being involved in the merger by name, most saw this as the teams continuation of the original team, and not the Lechia-Polonia team. The reforming meant that Polonia had to restart from Poland's lowest divisions. The highest the team has achieved since the turn of the century was 2 seasons in the third division, finishing 14th and 16th from 2012–14. Back to back relegation's meant the team were playing in the firth tier once again, and currently find themselves playing in the District Division - Gdańsk Group I.

Lechia Gdańsk also created a separate team from the Lechia-Polonia team in 2001, and was also seen as the continuation of the team before the merger. In 2001 there were therefore 3 teams playing football as a result of the merger; Lechia-Polonia Gdańsk, Lechia Gdańsk, and Polonia Gdańsk. While the dissolved Lechia-Polonia team left both Lechia and Polonia in much worse positions than before the merger, Lechia took full advantage of the situation they found themselves in. After having to start from the bottom, Lechia's fortunes changed and they found themselves playing in the Ekstraklasa once again for the 2008/09 season. After 11 seasons of continuous top flight football Lechia won both the Polish Cup and the Polish SuperCup in 2019, leading to the team playing European football for only the second time in their history.

Seasons

Player statistics

Seasonal top goalscorers

The players who scored the most goals for the club during a season.

Top player statistics

The top 5 players with the most appearances and goals in the league for Lechia-Polonia.

League statistics

All of the league statistics of all players over the four seasons of the clubs existence.

Managerial statistics

This is a list of Lechia-Polonia Gdańsk managers and their statistics in all competitive competitions. This list includes caretaker managers, shown here in italics.

Kits

The kits worn by Lechia-Polonia during their four seasons of existence.

1998–99

The 1998–99 kits were produced by Uhlsport with Pomorskie Towarzystwo Leasingowe being the sponsor on the shirts.

1999–2000

Lechia-Polonia started the season with the same kits as the previous season, adding a third shirt which bore the sponsor Centertel. After the winter break Lechia dropped what they used as their home kit in favour of using one of the Kelme shirts used by Lechia Gdańsk between 1996–98. The three kits made by three different manufacturers were used on a rotational basis, with the green and white "half and half" kit being used more often as it incorporated the most green and could be used against more opponents.

2000–01

In 2000 Adidas became the manufacturer of the Lechia-Polonia kits, with Centertel being the main club sponsor. Canal+ also held a minor sponsorship role, with a small logo also featuring on the front of the shirts. The two Adidas shirts were used interchangeably with neither kit having a preference as the "home shirt". Lechia-Polonia also used two previously used shirts, with the "half and half" shirt having the Canal+ logo placed above the Uhlsport logo removing any indication of who previously made the shirt.

2001–02

In the last year of Lechia-Polonia's existence they played in the same Adidas kits as the season before.

References 

Defunct football clubs in Poland
Association football clubs established in 1998
1998 establishments in Poland
Association football clubs disestablished in 2002
2002 disestablishments in Poland
Sport in Gdańsk
Lechia Gdańsk